Joshua Brookes (1761–1833) was a British anatomist.

Joshua Brookes may also refer to:

Joshua Brookes (divine) (1754–1821), Anglican divine and English eccentric
Josh Brookes (born 1983), Australian motorcycle road racer

See also
Joshua Brooks (disambiguation)